Kevin Kahn Wong  (born September 12, 1972, in Honolulu, Hawaii) is a retired professional beach volleyball player. He currently lives in Hawaii and runs a volleyball training program for youth.

Personal life 
Wong graduated from the Punahou School. He then attended UCLA and received his degree in economics in 1995. Wong was named to People Magazine's "50 Most Beautiful People" issue in 2000. He was honored by the Chinese Historical Society of Southern California in "Celebrating Chinese Americans in Sports", May 2009. He served as a beach volleyball analyst for NBC Sports at the Summer Olympics of 2012 and 2016 and continues to work on all of NBC's coverage. He is the founder and director of Spike and Serve, a Hawaii-based non-profit program that aims to positively shape lives through the sport of volleyball. Wong is also involved with the Chinese American variation of volleyball called 9-man. He is featured in the documentary about the sport called 9-Man. Wong is active in the community where he grew up, a Hawaii board member of the Positive Coaching Alliance  In 2014, Wong was honored by USA Volleyball as the junior service award winner for outstanding male coach after leading his U15 team to an undefeated gold medal finish at the Girls Junior National Championships.

Career
At UCLA, the 6'7" Wong was a three-time All-American. He helped the team win NCAA championships in 1993 and 1995. After college, he switched to professional beach volleyball. In 2000, he paired with Rob Heidger to finish 5th at the Sydney Olympics. Along with partner Casey Jennings, they successfully ended the 2010 season by capturing gold at the Swatch FIVB World Tour after beating the Brazilian duo of Benjamin Insfran and Bruno Schmidt at The Hague, Netherlands.

References

External links
Kevin Wong profile at avp.com
Kevin Wong CNN article

Profile at NBC Sports Pressbox

American men's beach volleyball players
American sportspeople of Chinese descent
Living people
1972 births
Hawaii people of Chinese descent
Punahou School alumni
UCLA Bruins men's volleyball players